CS Dinamo București is a professional water polo club based in Bucharest, Romania.

Honours

Champions: 32 times
  1957, 1958, 1959, 1960, 1961, 1962, 1963, 1964, 1965, 1966, 1967, 1968, 1969, 1970, 1971, 1973, 1974, 1978, 1979, 1980, 1982, 1983, 1984, 1987, 1988, 1989, 1990, 1996, 1997, 1998, 1999, 2000
LEN Champions League
 1968
 1975; 1988 
  4 1967; 1973
LEN Cup Winners' Cup
 1986

External links
Official website
Romanian Waterpolo Federation
Club's page at h2opolo.ro

Water polo
Water polo clubs in Romania